The Battle of Tangdao (唐岛之战) was a naval engagement that took place in 1161 between the Jurchen Jin and the Southern Song Dynasty of China on the East China Sea. The conflict was part of the Jin-Song wars, and was fought near Tangdao Island. It was an attempt by the Jin to invade and conquer the Southern Song Dynasty, yet resulted in failure and defeat for the Jurchens. The Jin Dynasty navy was set on fire by firearms and Fire Arrows, suffering heavy losses. For this battle, the commander of the Song Dynasty squadron, Li Bao, faced the opposing commander Zheng Jia, the admiral of the Jin Dynasty. On the fate of Zheng Jia, the historical text of the Jin Shi states:

This battle was followed by another naval confrontation, the Battle of Caishi (采石之战) taking place in 1161. The battle is significant in the technological history of the Song navy. The 20th-century historian Joseph Needham has called the era "one of continual innovation" when the size of the Song fleet grew "from a total of 11 squadrons and 3,000 men [the Song navy] rose in one century to 20 squadrons totalling 52,000 men, with its main base near Shanghai." They were further reinforced by the aid of seafaring Chinese merchants. The technological gains of the Song navy ensured its access and dominance of the East China Sea for centuries in competition with the military forces of Jurchen and Mongol rivals. By 1129, the Song navy had invented gunpowder bombs for warship trebuchets. The weapon was made mandatory for all ships in the Song fleet. The construction of paddle-wheel ships, operated with treadmills, went on for several decades between 1132 and 1183. The engineer Gao Xuan devised a paddle-wheel ship outfitted with up to eleven paddle-wheels on each side. Iron plating for armoring the ships was designed in 1203 by the engineer Qin Shifu.

See also
Naval warfare
Maritime history
Naval history of China
Military history of China (pre-1911)
Jin–Song Wars
Timeline of the Jin–Song Wars
History of the Song Dynasty
Technology of the Song Dynasty
Gunpowder warfare
Jiao Yu

Notes

References

Tangdao
Tangdao
Tangdao
Tangdao
1161 in Asia
12th century in China
Tangdao